Nassima Abidi is a Tunisian former footballer. She has been a member of the Tunisia women's national team.

Club career
Abidi has played for ISSEP Kef in Tunisia.

International career
Abidi capped for Tunisia at senior level during the 2008 African Women's Championship.

International goals
Scores and results list Tunisia's goal tally first

See also
List of Tunisia women's international footballers

References

Living people
Tunisian women's footballers
Tunisia women's international footballers
Year of birth missing (living people)
Women's association footballers not categorized by position